André Vallini (born 15 July 1956) is a French politician. He is the grandson of Italian immigrants and the son of a small industrialist from Tullins. He was President of the general council for Isère from 2011 to 2014 and member of the French Senate from 2011 to 2014. From 2016, he served as State Secretary for Francophonie in the Second Valls Government. He was the deputy for Isère's 9th constituency in the National Assembly of France from 1997 to 2011.

In addition to his role in parliament, Vallini has been serving as member of the French delegation to the Parliamentary Assembly of the Council of Europe since 2017. He is part of the Socialists, Democrats and Greens Group and serves on the Committee on Legal Affairs and Human Rights as well as on the Sub-Committee on the implementation of judgments of the European Court of Human Rights.

Notes and references 

1956 births
Living people
Socialist Party (France) politicians
French people of Italian descent
Deputies of the 12th National Assembly of the French Fifth Republic
Deputies of the 13th National Assembly of the French Fifth Republic
Senators of Isère
People from Isère
Politicians from Auvergne-Rhône-Alpes
French Senators of the Fifth Republic